Ivan Heimschild (born 5 March 1980 in Martin) is a Slovak former alpine skier who competed in the 2002 Winter Olympics and in the 2006 Winter Olympics.

References

1980 births
Living people
Slovak male alpine skiers
Olympic alpine skiers of Slovakia
Alpine skiers at the 2002 Winter Olympics
Alpine skiers at the 2006 Winter Olympics
Universiade medalists in alpine skiing
Sportspeople from Martin, Slovakia
Universiade bronze medalists for Slovakia
Medalists at the 2003 Winter Universiade